Avinash Mishra is an Indian television actor. He made his acting debut with Sethji (2017) playing Bajirao. He his best known for playing Shantanu Mazumdar in Yeh Teri Galiyan and Kunal Rajvansh in Yeh Rishtey Hain Pyaar Ke.

Career
Mishra started his career by appearing in advertisements. He made his television debut in 2017 with Zee TV's Sethji as Bajirao. Later, in the same year he appeared in Zing's Pyaar Tune Kya Kiya opposite Jiya Shankar.

Next, he played Abhay Singh Oberoi in Star Plus's Ishqbaaaz. Then he starred in Love on the Run as Sid.

It was followed by Sony TV's Zindagi Ke Crossroads in the role of Sugreev. Mishra then portrayed Zain Ashraf in Mariam Khan but later quit and was replaced by Himanshu Malhotra.

From 2018 to 2020, he starred as Shantanu Mazumdar in Zee TV's Yeh Teri Galiyan opposite Vrushika Mehta. In August 2020, he essayed Kunal Rajvansh in Star Plus's Yeh Rishtey Hain Pyaar Ke opposite Kaveri Priyam.

From 2020 to 2021, he appeared as Dev Aneja in Star Bharat's Durga – Mata Ki Chhaya opposite Chahat Pandey. In February 2022, he enter as main lead Aryan Mishra in Dangal TV's Nath: Zevar Ya Zanjeer.

Filmography

Television

Short films

Music videos

References

External links

21st-century Indian male actors
Living people
Indian male television actors
1995 births
Male actors from Patna
Male actors from Bihar